In computing, disk failure usually refers to the failure of a disk-based storage device, including:

 Floppy disk failure
 Hard disk drive failure

See also 
 Fault-tolerant system
 RAID
 Data redundancy
 Disaster recovery
 Data recovery
 Data loss

Not to be confused with
 Slipped disk, a medical condition of a spine